Porella platyphylla is a species of liverwort belonging to the family Porellaceae. It is native to Eurasia and North America.

References

Porellales
Taxa named by Carl Linnaeus